Trinucleotide repeat-containing gene 6B protein is a protein that in humans is encoded by the TNRC6B gene.

Interactions 

TNRC6B has been shown to interact with EIF2C2. It is also known to associate with argonaute proteins and has been shown to be required for miRNA-guided gene silencing in HeLa cells.

References

Further reading